Narcís Ventalló (17 October 1940 – 22 December 2018) was a Catalan field hockey player. Throughout his career, he competed for Spain in the 1960 Summer Olympics, the 1964 Summer Olympics, and the 1968 Summer Olympics. He was born in Terrassa, Barcelona.

References

External links
 
 
 

1940 births
2018 deaths
Field hockey players from Catalonia
Spanish male field hockey players
Olympic medalists in field hockey
Olympic bronze medalists for Spain
Olympic field hockey players of Spain
Field hockey players at the 1960 Summer Olympics
Field hockey players at the 1964 Summer Olympics
Field hockey players at the 1968 Summer Olympics
Medalists at the 1960 Summer Olympics
Sportspeople from Terrassa
20th-century Spanish people